Old Warson Country Club is a country club located in St. Louis, Missouri. Founded in 1953, it hosted the 1971 Ryder Cup and the 2009 U.S. Women's Amateur Golf Championship. The golf course was designed by Robert Trent Jones. 

Hale Irwin, the winner of three U.S. Opens, joined the club in 1974 as a junior member; since 1977 he has been an active member.

Until 1991, Old Warson Country Club banned Black and Jewish people from joining. That year, it cancelled plans to host a PGA Senior Tour event rather than change its discriminatory rules. Several months later, the club admitted its first Black member: Frederick S. Wood, a retired executive vice president at General Dynamics.

The initiation fee was $45,000 ($ today) in 1996 and $80,000 ($ today) in 2006.

Major tournaments held at Old Warson

Notes

External links
Official website

Golf clubs and courses in Missouri
Golf in Missouri
Ryder Cup venues
Buildings and structures in St. Louis County, Missouri
1954 establishments in Missouri